The meridian 53° west of Greenwich is a line of longitude that extends from the North Pole across the Arctic Ocean, Greenland, Newfoundland, the Atlantic Ocean, South America, the Southern Ocean, and Antarctica to the South Pole.

In Antarctica, the meridian defines the eastern limit of Chile's territorial claim and passes through the British and Argentinian claims - the three claims overlap.  It also defines the western limit of Brazil's unofficial claim.

The 53rd meridian west forms a great circle with the 127th meridian east.

From Pole to Pole
Starting at the North Pole and heading south to the South Pole, the 53rd meridian west passes through:

{| class="wikitable plainrowheaders"
! scope="col" width="120" | Co-ordinates
! scope="col" width="120" | Country, territory or sea
! scope="col" | Notes
|-
| style="background:#b0e0e6;" | 
! scope="row" style="background:#b0e0e6;" | Arctic Ocean
| style="background:#b0e0e6;" |
|-
| style="background:#b0e0e6;" | 
! scope="row" style="background:#b0e0e6;" | Lincoln Sea
| style="background:#b0e0e6;" |
|-
| 
! scope="row" | 
| Hendrik Island
|-
| style="background:#b0e0e6;" | 
! scope="row" style="background:#b0e0e6;" | Saint George Fjord
| style="background:#b0e0e6;" |
|-valign="top"
| 
! scope="row" | 
| The mainland, and the islands of Qeqertarsuaq and Upernivik
|-
| style="background:#b0e0e6;" | 
! scope="row" style="background:#b0e0e6;" | Uummannaq Fjord
| style="background:#b0e0e6;" |
|-
| 
! scope="row" | 
| Nuussuaq Peninsula
|-
| style="background:#b0e0e6;" | 
! scope="row" style="background:#b0e0e6;" | Sullorsuaq Strait
| style="background:#b0e0e6;" |
|-
| 
! scope="row" | 
| Disko Island
|-
| style="background:#b0e0e6;" | 
! scope="row" style="background:#b0e0e6;" | Disko Bay
| style="background:#b0e0e6;" |
|-valign="top"
| 
! scope="row" | 
| Passing through the mainland and many islands on the coast, including Saqqarliup Nunaa, Aamat, Sermersut and Maniitsoq
|-valign="top"
| style="background:#b0e0e6;" | 
! scope="row" style="background:#b0e0e6;" | Atlantic Ocean
| style="background:#b0e0e6;" | Passing just east of the Bonavista Peninsula, Newfoundland and Labrador,  (at )
|-valign="top"
| 
! scope="row" | 
| Newfoundland and Labrador — Bay de Verde Peninsula on the island of Newfoundland
|-
| style="background:#b0e0e6;" | 
! scope="row" style="background:#b0e0e6;" | Conception Bay
| style="background:#b0e0e6;" | 
|-valign="top"
| 
! scope="row" | 
| Newfoundland and Labrador — Bell Island
|-
| style="background:#b0e0e6;" | 
! scope="row" style="background:#b0e0e6;" | Conception Bay
| style="background:#b0e0e6;" | 
|-valign="top"
| 
! scope="row" | 
| Newfoundland and Labrador — Avalon Peninsula on the island of Newfoundland
|-
| style="background:#b0e0e6;" | 
! scope="row" style="background:#b0e0e6;" | Atlantic Ocean
| style="background:#b0e0e6;" |
|-
| 
! scope="row" | 
| French Guiana
|-valign="top"
| 
! scope="row" | 
| Amapá Pará — from  Mato Grosso — from  Goiás — from  Mato Grosso do Sul — from  São Paulo — for about 10 km from  Paraná — from  Santa Catarina — from  Rio Grande do Sul— from 
|-
| style="background:#b0e0e6;" | 
! scope="row" style="background:#b0e0e6;" | Atlantic Ocean
| style="background:#b0e0e6;" |
|-
| style="background:#b0e0e6;" | 
! scope="row" style="background:#b0e0e6;" | Southern Ocean
| style="background:#b0e0e6;" |
|-valign="top"
| 
! scope="row" | Antarctica
|-
|}

See also
52nd meridian west
54th meridian west

w053 meridian west